Mayaa-muluqo is a district of Somali Region in Ethiopia.

See also

 Districts of Ethiopia

References

Districts of Somali Region